Clearmont is a town in Sheridan County, Wyoming, United States. The population was 142 at the 2010 census.

Demographics

2010 census
As of the census of 2010, there were 142 people, 57 households, and 41 families residing in the town. The racial makeup of the town was 95.1% White, 3.5% Native American, 0.7% from other races, and 0.7% from two or more races. Hispanic or Latino of any race were 7.7% of the population.

There were 57 households, of which 40.4% had children under the age of 18 living with them, 52.6% were married couples living together, 12.3% had a female householder with no husband present, 7.0% had a male householder with no wife present, and 28.1% were non-families. 21.1% of all households were made up of individuals, and 1.8% had someone living alone who was 65 years of age or older. The average household size was 2.49 and the average family size was 2.78.

The median age in the town was 35.8 years. 30.3% of residents were under the age of 18; 4.1% were between the ages of 18 and 24; 25.3% were from 25 to 44; 34.5% were from 45 to 64; and 5.6% were 65 years of age or older. The gender makeup of the town was 45.1% male and 54.9% female.

2000 census
As of the census of 2000, there were 115 people, 50 households, and 29 families residing in the town. There were 65 housing units at an average density of 431.3 per square mile (45.1/km2). The racial makeup of the town was 97.39% White, 0.87% from other races, and 1.74% from two or more races. Hispanic or Latino of any race were 3.48% of the population.

There were 50 households, out of which 28.0% had children under the age of 18 living with them, 36.0% were married couples living together, 14.0% had a female householder with no husband present, and 42.0% were non-families. 40.0% of all households were made up of individuals, and 10.0% had someone living alone who was 65 years of age or older. The average household size was 2.30 and the average family size was 3.00.

In the town, the population was spread out, with 26.1% under the age of 18, 6.1% from 18 to 24, 32.2% from 25 to 44, 28.7% from 45 to 64, and 7.0% who were 65 years of age or older. The median age was 40 years. For every 100 females, there were 105.4 males. For every 100 females age 18 and over, there were 93.2 males.

The median income for a household in the town was $40,833, and the median income for a family was $44,167. Males had a median income of $26,250 versus $20,500 for females. The per capita income for the town was $12,901. There were 19.4% of families and 20.0% of the population living below the poverty line, including 13.7% of under eighteens and 50.0% of those over 64.

Media
Television and radio signals in the region originate from Sheridan and Gillette. Although KLQQ 104.9 FM is licensed to Clearmont, its transmitter is 36 miles west. Gillette stations are weak but receivable in Clearmont and Arvada.

Education
Public education in the town of Clearmont is provided by Sheridan County School District #3. Schools serving the town include Clearmont Elementary School (grades PK-6), Arvada-Clearmont Junior High School (grades 7-8), and Arvada-Clearmont High School District (grades 9-12).

Clearmont has a public library, a branch of the Sheridan County Public Library System.

Geography and climate

According to the Köppen Climate Classification system, Clearmont has a cold semi-arid climate, abbreviated "BSk" on climate maps.

See also
 List of municipalities in Wyoming

References

Towns in Sheridan County, Wyoming
Towns in Wyoming